Jos Theatre is the first permanent movie theatre in Kerala. Located in Swaraj Round in Thrissur city, it was built by Kattukkaran Varunny Joseph, the first man to screen the film in Kerala. The movie theatre was earlier known as Jose Electrical Bioscope.

References

Malayalam cinema
Theatres completed in 1936
Tourist attractions in Thrissur
Buildings and structures in Thrissur
20th-century architecture in India